La Mina is an album by Italian singer Mina, distributed in 1975 back to back with album Minacantalucio.

Track listing

Credits
Mina – vocals
Pino Presti – arranger/conductor in "Ti accetto come sei", "Quasi come musica (A Song for You)", "L'importante è finire", "Di già"
Enrico Riccardi – arranger/conductor in "Uappa"
Shel Shapiro – arrangers/conductors in "Immagina un concerto"
Toto Torquati – arranger/conductor in "Signora più che mai", "Tu no"
Gabriel Yared – arranger/conductor in "Racconto (C'est comme l'arc en ciel)", "Come un uomo (Comme un homme)"
Nuccio Rinaldis – sound engineer

1975 albums
Mina (Italian singer) albums
Italian-language albums
Albums conducted by Pino Presti
Albums arranged by Pino Presti